Charles Blackman ( – 16 March 1853) was a Church of England priest and school administrator in St John's, Newfoundland.

References 

1790s births
1853 deaths
Canadian Anglican priests
People from Newfoundland (island)
Year of birth uncertain